Earl Brown (born 23 June 1952) is a Puerto Rican former basketball player who competed in the 1972 Summer Olympics and in the 1976 Summer Olympics. He played college basketball for Lafayette as a center, and was 1973-1974 Middle Atlantic Conference Player of the Year.

References

1952 births
Living people
Basketball players at the 1972 Summer Olympics
Basketball players at the 1976 Summer Olympics
Basketball players at the 1975 Pan American Games
Lafayette Leopards men's basketball players
Olympic basketball players of Puerto Rico
Pan American Games silver medalists for Puerto Rico
Puerto Rican men's basketball players
Pan American Games medalists in basketball
Medalists at the 1975 Pan American Games